The 2020 Colonial Athletic Association women's basketball tournament was a postseason women's basketball tournament for the Colonial Athletic Association for the 2019–20 NCAA Division I women's basketball season. The tournament was scheduled to be held from March 11–14, 2020 at the Schar Center in Elon, North Carolina. The champion would have received the CAA's automatic bid to the NCAA tournament. On March 12, the NCAA announced that the tournament was cancelled due to the coronavirus pandemic.

Seeds
All 10 CAA teams are expected to participate in the tournament. Teams will be seeded by conference record, with a tiebreaker system used to seed teams with identical conference records. The top six teams will receive a bye to the quarterfinals.

Schedule

Bracket

* denotes overtime game

See also
 2020 CAA men's basketball tournament

References

External links
 2020 CAA Women's Basketball Championship

Colonial Athletic Association women's basketball tournament
 
CAA
College basketball tournaments in North Carolina
Elon, North Carolina
Women's sports in North Carolina
CAA women's basketball tournament